Fausto Luis Momente Silva (born December 12, 1980 in Mirandópolis), known as Fausto, is a retired Brazilian footballer who played as forward.

Career statistics

References

External links

1980 births
Living people
Brazilian footballers
Association football forwards
Clube Atlético Linense players
Atlético Monte Azul players
Botafogo Futebol Clube (SP) players
Botafogo Futebol Clube (PB) players
América Futebol Clube (SP) players
Sertãozinho Futebol Clube players
União Agrícola Barbarense Futebol Clube players
Viktoria Aschaffenburg players
Diagoras F.C. players
Anápolis Futebol Clube players
Goiás Esporte Clube players
Esporte Clube Juventude players
Marília Atlético Clube players
People from Mirandópolis